JHS may refer to:

 Christogram (ΙΗΣ), derived from the first three letters of the Greek name of Jesus
 Jacksonville Historical Society, in Florida, United States
 Jhankot Sign Language, a village sign language of Nepal
 Jhansi Junction railway station, in Uttar Pradesh, India
 JHS Pedals, a guitar effects pedals manufacturer
 Jordan–Hare Stadium, in Alabama, United States
 Journal of Hellenic Studies
 Sisimiut Airport, in Greenland
 Joint hypermobility syndrome, now known as hypermobility spectrum disorder

Schools 

 Junior high school

Individual schools
 Harry D. Jacobs High School, in Algonquin, Illinois, United States
 Jain Heritage School, in Bangalore, India
 Jaluit High School in Jaluit, Marshall Islands
 Jhansi High School, in Mallapur, Hyderabad, India
 Jackson High School (disambiguation)
 Jacksonville High School (disambiguation)
 James Hornsby School, in Basildon, Essex, England
 Jamestown High School (disambiguation)
 Jasper High School (disambiguation)
 Jefferson High School (disambiguation)
 Jeffersonville High School, in Indiana, United States
 Jemison High School, in Alabama, United States
 Jenison High School, in Michigan, United States
 Jericho High School, in Nassau County, New York, United States
 Jesuit High School (disambiguation)
 Jimtown High School (Elkhart, Indiana), in the United States
 Johnsburg High School, in Illinois, United States
 Johnson High School (disambiguation)
 Johnston High School, in Iowa, United States
 Johnstown High School, in New York, United States
 Jonesboro High School (disambiguation)
 Joplin High School, in Missouri, United States
 Juanita High School, in King County, Washington, United States
 Juniata High School, in Juniata County, Pennsylvania, United States
 Juab High School, in Nephi, Utah, United States
 Jupiter Community High School, in Florida, United States